Lili Fini Zanuck ( Fini; born April 2, 1954) is an American film producer and director.

Personal life 
She was married to Richard D. Zanuck from 1978 until his death in 2012.

Career 
Zanuck's first film with a producing title was the 1985 critical and commercial hit Cocoon which went on to win 2 Academy Awards and earned the Zanucks and David Brown the title Producer of the Year by the National Association of Theatre Owners. Lili also oversaw the sequel Cocoon: The Return in 1988.

In 1988, Zanuck and her husband formed The Zanuck Company. The first film they produced was Driving Miss Daisy which went on to win four Academy Awards, including Best Picture, as well as winning Best Picture of the Year (Best Musical or Comedy) by the Hollywood Foreign Press Association and the National Board of Review. The Zanucks were named Producer of the Year by the Producers Guild of America. Internationally, the film won two Golden Bears at the Berlin Film Festival and was nominated for Best Picture by the British Film Academy. Driving Miss Daisy was a financial success, grossing more than $100 million and ranks as one of the most profitable films in Warner Bros. history.

Zanuck directed the 1991 feature film Rush starring Jennifer Jason Leigh and Jason Patric. The film notably featured the hit song "Tears in Heaven" by Eric Clapton, who also composed the score for the picture. For television, she directed an episode of HBO's From the Earth to the Moon, and three episodes of NBC's six hour event series Revelations starring Bill Pullman.

Zanuck has also co-produced a number of films including Mulholland Falls, True Crime and Reign of Fire.

In March 2000, Zanuck co-produced the 72nd Academy Awards with her husband.

In May 2015, Zanuck executive produced and directed Bessie which premiered on HBO. She developed the project for over 22 years which was met with critical acclaim, receiving twelve 2016 Primetime Emmy Award nominations. Bessie won the 2015 Primetime Emmy Award for Outstanding Television Movie and the 2015 Critics Choice Television Award for Best Movie.

Most recently Zanuck directed the documentary Eric Clapton: Life in 12 Bars which had its world premiere at the Toronto International Film Festival in September 2017 before airing on SHOWTIME in February 2018. The film and Zanuck were Grammy nominated in the category of Best Music Film.

Zanuck has also directed television programs and music videos, including Faith Hill's "Breathe", which won the Academy of Country Music Award for Video of the Year in 1999.

Filmography

Film

Television

Music videos

References

External links 
 

Living people
1954 births
American film directors
American film producers
American women film producers
Golden Globe Award-winning producers
Primetime Emmy Award winners
Producers who won the Best Picture Academy Award
21st-century American women